In enzymology, a pyruvate synthase is an enzyme that catalyzes the interconversion of pyruvate and acetyl-CoA.  It is also called pyruvate:ferredoxin oxidoreductase (PFOR).

The relevant equilibrium catalysed by PFOR is:
pyruvate + CoA + oxidized ferredoxin  acetyl-CoA + CO2 + reduced ferredoxin

The 3 substrates of this enzyme are pyruvate, CoA, and oxidized ferredoxin, whereas its 3 products are acetyl-CoA, CO2, and reduced ferredoxin.

Function 

This enzyme participates in 4 metabolic pathways: pyruvate metabolism, propanoate metabolism, butanoate metabolism, and reductive carboxylate cycle ( fixation).

Its major role is the extraction of reducing equivalents by the decarboxylation.  In aerobic organisms, this conversion is catalysed by pyruvate dehydrogenase, also uses thiamine pyrophosphate (TPP) but relies on lipoate as the electron acceptor. Unlike the aerobic enzyme complex PFOR transfers reducing equivalents to flavins or iron-sulflur clusters. This process links glycolysis to the Wood–Ljungdahl pathway.

Nomenclature 

This enzyme belongs to the family of oxidoreductases, specifically those acting on the aldehyde or oxo group of donor with an iron-sulfur protein as acceptor.  The systematic name of this enzyme class is pyruvate:ferredoxin 2-oxidoreductase (CoA-acetylating). Other names in common use include:
 pyruvate oxidoreductase, 
 pyruvate synthetase, 
 pyruvate:ferredoxin oxidoreductase, 
 pyruvic-ferredoxin oxidoreductase.

Structure 

PFOR adopts a dimeric structure, while each monomeric subunit is composed of one or multiple chain(s) of polypeptides. Each monomeric subunit of PFOR consists of six domains binding one TPP molecule and three [4Fe-4S] clusters.

Catalytic Mechanism 

An PFOR reaction starts with the nucleophilic attack of C2 of TPP on the 2-oxo carbon of pyruvate, which forms a lactyl-TPP adduct. Next, the lactyl-TPP adduct releases the CO2 moiety, forming an anionic intermediate, which then transfer an electron to a [4Fe-4S] cluster. These steps lead to a stable radical intermediate that can be observed by electron paramagnetic resonance (EPR) experiments. The radical intermediate reacts with a CoA molecule, transfers another electron from the radical intermediate to a [4Fe-4S] cluster and forms an acetyl-CoA product.

Inhibitors 

Nitazoxanide is a broad-spectrum antiparasitic drug and FDA-approved PFOR inhibitor which is used for the treatment of Giardiasis and Cryptosporidiosis.
Tizoxanide, an active metabolite of nitazoxanide
Amixicile, a water-soluble derivative of nitazoxanide, is a potent inhibitor of pyruvate:ferredoxin oxidoreductase and is in pre-clinical studies to treat infections of Helicobacter pylori and Clostridium difficile.

References

Further reading 

 
 
 
 
 

EC 1.2.7
Enzymes of known structure